John David Jamerson (born August 13, 1967) is an American former professional basketball player who was selected by the Miami Heat in the first round (15th pick overall) of the 1990 NBA draft. Jamerson played for the Houston Rockets, Utah Jazz and New Jersey Nets in 3 NBA seasons. His best year as a pro came during the 1991-92 NBA season as a member of the Rockets, when he appeared in 48 games and averaged 4.0 ppg. He played collegiately at Ohio University, averaging 31.2 points per game a senior, finishing 2nd in the nation in scoring.  In 1989, against the University of Charleston, he set a single-game record by draining fourteen 3-pointers and scoring 60 points in the Ohio victory.  His #33 jersey at OU was retired during a halftime ceremony during a January 2007 game.  Jamerson graduated from Stow-Munroe Falls High School.   He was an Outreach Pastor at Traders Point Christian Church in Indianapolis, Indiana. Now he is the pastor of Renovate Church in Cedar Park, Texas.

See also
 List of NCAA Division I men's basketball players with 60 or more points in a game
 List of NCAA Division I men's basketball players with 12 or more 3-point field goals in a game
 List of NCAA Division I men's basketball season 3-point field goal leaders

References

External links
NBA stats @ basketballreference.com
TPCC @ Staff - Traders Point Christian Church

1967 births
Living people
American men's basketball players
Basketball players at the 1995 Pan American Games
Basketball players from Ohio
Basketball players from West Virginia
Houston Rockets players
Ohio Bobcats men's basketball players
Omaha Racers players
Miami Heat draft picks
New Jersey Nets players
Pan American Games medalists in basketball
Pan American Games silver medalists for the United States
Rochester Renegade players
Shooting guards
Sportspeople from Clarksburg, West Virginia
Utah Jazz players
Medalists at the 1995 Pan American Games